Anthony John Leslie Lloyd, Baron Lloyd of Berwick,  (called Tony; born 9 May 1929) is a retired British judge, and a former member of the House of Lords.

Early life and education
Lloyd was born on 9 May 1929, the son of Edward John Boydell Lloyd and Leslie Johnston Fleming. He was educated at Eton College, where he was a King's Scholar. After serving in the British Army, Lloyd studied law at Trinity College, Cambridge. He was admitted to the Inner Temple as a barrister in 1955.

Military service
On 27 November 1948, Lloyd was commissioned into the Coldstream Guards as a second lieutenant. On 27 September 1949, he transferred to the Regular Army Reserve of Officers as a second lieutenant with seniority from 1 January 1949; this ended his full-time military service. He was promoted to lieutenant on 3 August 1950. He relinquished his British Army commission on 9 December 1953.

Career
Lloyd was a barrister and "took silk" as a Queen's Counsel in 1967. In 1969 he was appointed Attorney-General to the Prince of Wales, serving until 1977. In 1978, he was appointed High Court Judge of Queen's Bench, serving until 1983. In 1984, he was appointed Lord Justice of Appeal, serving until 1993, and made a Privy Counsellor. From 1985 to 1992 he was the Interception of Communications Commissioner. On 1 October 1993, he was appointed Lord of Appeal in Ordinary (a "Law Lord"), serving until his resignation on 31 December 1998. He was the leading judgment in the case of Page v Smith (1995).

In 1993 he wrote a letter in support of Bishop Peter Ball, who was later convicted of child sexual abuse. He chaired the special committee on the proposed Speakership of the House of Lords. In 1996, he conducted a review of British laws against terrorism; his report, Inquiry Into Legislation Against Terrorism, was issued in October 1996. He is a former member of the Court of Ecclesiastical Causes Reserved. In 2005 he became chairman of the parliamentary Ecclesiastical Committee which examines draft measures presented to it by the Legislative Committee of the General Synod of the Church of England. On 27 March 2015, he retired from the House of Lords.

Honours
When appointed to Queen's Bench in 1978, he was made a Knight Bachelor. When appointed Lord of Appeal in Ordinary in 1993, he was raised to the House of Lords with the title Baron Lloyd of Berwick, of Ludlay in the County of East Sussex. He held the office of Deputy Lieutenant (D.L.) of East Sussex in 1983. As a leading barrister, he held several honorary posts at the Inner Temple: Bencher in 1976, Reader in 1998 and 1999, and Treasurer in 1999.

Personal life
In 1960, he married Jane Helen Violet Shelford, the daughter of Cornelius William Shelford.

Arms

References

Lloyd of Berwick
Lloyd of Berwick
People educated at Eton College
Lloyd of Berwick
Lloyd of Berwick
Lloyd of Berwick
Berwick, Tony Lloyd, Baron Lloyd of
Members of the Judicial Committee of the Privy Council
Knights Bachelor
Coldstream Guards officers
Deputy Lieutenants of East Sussex
Lloyd family of Birmingham